Shawhan is an unincorporated community in Bourbon County, Kentucky, United States.

Shawhan was a station on the Kentucky Central Railroad.

References

Unincorporated communities in Bourbon County, Kentucky
Unincorporated communities in Kentucky